Surviving the Tsunami – My Atomic Aunt is a 2013 documentary film written, directed, and co-produced by Kyoko Miyake remembers the Fukushima nuclear disaster that occurred on March 11, 2011 by focusing on how the disaster has affected her home town of Namie, Fukushima, Japan. The film develops into a personal reflection on how the Fukushima disaster has affected not only the world, but Miyake herself and the family she once knew.

Director

After obtaining her degree in English History from the University of Tokyo, Kyoko Miyake moved to England to study English Witchcraft at Oxford University as a Swire Centenary Scholar. While on sabbatical from her doctoral program at Oxford, Miyake began to create historically themed independent documentary films. Her inspiration for her first international feature-length documentary, Surviving the Tsunami, came from her familial connection to the Japanese city of Namie, which had to be completely evacuated after the meltdown of the Fukushima Number One nuclear plant, and her anger at the way the disaster was being portrayed by the larger, mainstream media outlets. Kyoko has directed award winning documentaries including Hackney Lullabies, which have been screened in Berlin, Germany, London, England and Sydney, Australia. Kyoko Miyake currently resides in England.

Synopsis
Surviving the Tsunami brings together social, environmental, and personal perspectives of the national catastrophe of the Fukushima nuclear meltdown. In the documentary, Kyoko Miyake travels back to her hometown in Namie, Fukushima, to revisit her old life and assess the trauma still lingering from the disaster.  She revisits Namie, her mother's hometown and meets the people who depended on the success of the nuclear plant for their livelihood. The film also follows Bunsei Watanabe and Kyoko Miyake's Aunt Kuniko, two people who hope for the rejuvenation of Namie, despite the disaster that has occurred. Despite having lost family, friends, and jobs due to the meltdown and subsequent fear of the contamination zone, these two individuals are determined to rebuild their towns and neighborhoods and bring back the sense of community they once had. The film follows the residents of Namie, with emphasis on the experiences of Aunt Kuniko, as they come to terms with the reality of living in or near the "radiation zone" left in the wake the plant's nuclear meltdown. Surviving the Tsunami offers a different perspective on Japanese culture, national identity, human adaption, and global nuclear energy and proliferation.

Production 
The documentary was originally titled Beyond the Wave, yet the completed documentary was released as My Atomic Aunt. 
The film aired on seven television networks around the world in 2013, including the BBC, and NHK, Japan's National public broadcasting organization.

Jon Lynes, of Time Out London, describes Surviving the Tsunami, as "Haunting and moving ... as hard-hitting as it is simply presented... a timely reminder that the impact of the Fukushima disaster is still being felt....".

Awards, festivals, and screenings

 Hamburg Film Festival
 Dok Leipzig
 EDS International Documentary Festival
 Sundance Institute Documentary Grant Winner, Spring 2012
 NaturVision, German Conservation and Sustainability Film Prize, July 2014
 Winner, PUMA Creative Catalyst Award, Channel4 BRITDOC Foundation
 Winner, TIFFCOM Best Pitch Award, at Tokyo International Film Festival 
 Winner, Best Pitch Award, Tokyo TV Forum 2011 
 Winner, Best Japan Pitch, Asian Side of the Doc
 Gold Plaque Award, Chicago International Film Festival, Television Awards, April 2014
 Official Selection, Hamburg Film Festival (Germany), September 2013
 Official Selection, Dok Leipzig (Germany), October 2013
 Official Selection, EBS International Documentary Festival (South Korea), October 2013 Official Selection, DocPoint (Finland), 2014
 Official Selection, Paris Human Rights Film Festival, 2014

References

External links

 
 
 

2013 in the environment
2013 films
2013 documentary films
Documentary films about women
Japanese documentary films
German documentary films
Documentary films about the 2011 Tōhoku earthquake and tsunami
Documentary films about disasters
Documentary films about nuclear technology
2010s Japanese films
2010s German films